Ali Abdul Karim (born 1953) is a Syrian diplomat. He is the first Syrian ambassador to Lebanon. Before that he served as the ambassador to Kuwait and as the general manager of the Syrian Arab News Agency (SANA), and official Syrian Television. He holds a B.A. in Arabic Literature from the University of Damascus.

References

1953 births
Living people
Ambassadors of Syria to Kuwait
Ambassadors of Syria to Lebanon
Damascus University alumni